Other Words for Home is a 2019 free verse children's book by Jasmine Warga. The story is about a family of Syrian refugees with Jude, a 12-year-old girl, as protagonist. The book won a 2020 Newbery Honor.

Summary
The book is divided into six parts.

Part I : Change 
The story introduces Jude, a Syrian girl who aspires to be a movie star, and the sea-bordering city she lives in. The city's primary income depends on tourism, and tourists from around the world come. Jude is forbidden by her father to talk to the tourists. Fatima is Jude's neighbor and best friend. While they were once very close, they have started to drift away, as Fatima begins to mature and wear the hijab. Issa, Jude's older brother, is a revolutionary, who opposes the Syrian government. Issa's views cause a rift between him and Jude's father. Issa moves out of his family's house at the relatively young age of 16. Issa's apartment is raided by the Syrian police. Jude's mother is pregnant, and she and Jude have decided to leave Syria for the United States.

Reviews 

2019 children's books
American children's novels
Newbery Honor-winning works